The Wallingford Fire and Police Station, also known as the Wallingford Police Precinct Station, at  1629 N. 45th St. in Seattle, Washington was built in 1913.  It was listed on the National Register of Historic Places in 1983.

It was designed by architect Daniel Riggs Huntington.  It is a two-story  wood-frame building with a partial basement. It was built in 1913, then modified in 1921 when horse-drawn equipment was retired, then remodelled again in 1965.

References

External links

Fire stations on the National Register of Historic Places in Washington (state)
National Register of Historic Places in Seattle
Buildings and structures completed in 1913
Seattle Fire Department
Police stations on the National Register of Historic Places